Huanacuni (possibly from Aymara wanaku, wanaqu guanaco) is a mountain in the Apolobamba mountain range in the Bolivian Andes, about 5,796 metres (19,016 ft) high. It is situated in the La Paz Department, Franz Tamayo Province, Pelechuco Municipality, east of Cololo Lake and northwest of Qala Phusa (Cololo).

See also
 Jach'a Waracha
 Machu Such'i Qhuchi
 List of mountains in the Andes

References 

Mountains of La Paz Department (Bolivia)